Sanmen Island is an island in Daya Bay. Administratively it belongs to Huizhou. It lies 1.5 and 8.7 nautical miles to Dapeng Peninsula, Shenzhen and Sai Kung, Hong Kong respectively. Its highest point is 298 meters above sea level.  It is 5 km2 in size and has a coastline of 13 kilometers.

References

Huizhou
Islands of China